Progressive capitalism is an approach to capitalism that seeks to improve the current neoliberal American capitalism that emerged in 1980. Progressive capitalism aims to improve economic results through four defining beliefs, namely the vital role businesses play in the economy by creating jobs, fostering innovation, enabling voluntary exchange, and providing competitive goods and services; the recognition of the important role public goods, public institutions, public services and public infrastructure play in supporting businesses including: research, schools, health care, social insurance, taxation, labor law and regulation of markets; the need for the state to be involved in design and oversight of the playing field; and the integration of social justice, stewardship of natural resources and responsibility to all major stakeholders. It is being advocated by Ro Khanna and Joseph Stiglitz.

Overview 
Capitalism incorporates the principles of private property, capital accumulation, wage labor, voluntary exchange, a price system, and competitive markets. It aims to deliver strong economic results and achieve competitive advantage in a global economy. Progressive capitalism is a refinement of capitalism. It aims to increase well paying jobs and economic growth through four defining beliefs:
The central role businesses play in the economy requires for success that they invest in their employees, protect the environment, support their communities, deal fairly and ethically with their suppliers, and increase value for shareholders. 
The important role of Institutions providing public goods and services, including infrastructure, research, schools, health care, social insurance, taxation, labor law, and regulation of markets.
The need for the state to be involved in their design.
The advocacy of social justice, defined as fairness (the assignment of rights and duties in the institutions of society, which enables all people both to receive the basic benefits of society and to contribute to obligations of society). Further advocacy for stewardship of natural resources and protection of the environment.

Progressive capitalism seeks to show how these improvements can be used by politicians and policy-makers to produce programs of economic reform. It does this by analyzing and proposing reforms and policies for the United States federal governance, corporate governance, equity markets, national systems and universities including support for innovative research, education and training systems.

Further, progressive capitalism describes the role the state should play in the economy—an empowering one, improving on the current American capitalism approach with better results that promote economic growth, more well-paying working/middle class jobs and help for new small businesses (for example, with wage support programs like the Earned Income Tax Credit). It seeks to provide better results for society and families than alternatives such as the command-and-control role of traditional socialism or the concentrating results from today's American capitalism which tends to redirect benefits toward the economically powerful and marginalize the economic majority.

The Progressive Party of Henry A. Wallace entertained the notion of progressive capitalism after its formation in 1946.

Progressive capitalism is currently being popularized by Ro Khanna, who believes free enterprise rewards hard work and innovation and is not just for the privileged and connected few. Progressive capitalists believe that a partnership among the private business sector, federal government and research universities fuels growth and that strategic investments will increase both the demand and supply of well-paying jobs in the 21st century. The partnership generates new technology and builds the launch pads for new and growing businesses. 

Joseph Stiglitz writes in People, Power, and Profits: Progressive Capitalism for an Age of Discontent (2019) that society needs a better understanding about the true source of "the wealth of a nation" which lies in the creativity and productivity of the nation's people and their productive interactions with each other and their institutions. He argues that progressive capitalism is not an oxymoron and explains how progressive improvements of capitalism would achieve a more dynamic economy, with greater shared prosperity and uplift the majority again to a middle-class life.

The Salt Lake Tribune 
In The Salt Lake Tribune "The Public Forum" the editor discusses labels used by political parties in their respective efforts for the 2020 election. A key conclusion in the article is that a large majority of Americans "would say they are capitalists." The focus needs to be on how to implement capitalism and how much the approach provides for collaboration between business and government at all levels on programs for investments and safety-net protections. The article offers a middle ground approach by "offering up these labels: Trumpism = reactionary capitalism; Bidenism = progressive capitalism." Concluding with "Now let’s move on and compromise."

2020 World Economic Forum 
The 2020 World Economic Forum at Davos highlighted disenchantment with the increasingly dominant American model of shareholder-first, profit-maximizing firms. Summarizing Joseph Stiglitz's comments about the event: "In speech after speech this year, business leaders and academics explained how Milton Friedman’s successful advocacy of shareholder capitalism led directly to the crises we face today and the political divisions they have fueled.  To be sure, recognition that there is a problem is necessary if we are to change course. But we also have to understand that the causes of societal maladies go beyond maximizing shareholder value. At the root of the problem is neoliberalism's excessive faith in markets and skepticism of government, which underpins a policy agenda focused on deregulation and tax cuts. After a 40-year experiment, we can declare it a failure. Growth has been lower, and most of the gains went to the top. While this should be obvious, there is no consensus among our business leaders.  And yet some of the business leaders at Davos this year, especially those from Europe, seemed to have grasped the urgency of responding to climate change and the scope of what is needed. And some have actually taken giant strides, the tide has turned.  In short, unfettered capitalism has played a central role in creating the multiple crises confronting our societies today. If capitalism is to work – if it is to address these crises and serve society – it can't do so in its current form. There must be a new kind of capitalism – what I have elsewhere called progressive capitalism, entailing a better balance of government, markets, and civil society."

Criticism 

Critics of neoliberal capitalism associate the economic system with social inequality, unfair distribution of wealth and power; materialism, repression of workers and trade unionists, social alienation, economic inequality, unemployment, and economic instability. Nick Beams writes that progressive capitalism will not address the problems created by neoliberal capitalism which institutionalized a system whereby the wealth created by the labor of the working class was siphoned up to the heights of society. This wealth concentration leads to the decline in real wages and the greatest level of social inequality seen at any point in US history.

References 

Capitalist systems